Koyamada International Foundation, commonly referred to as KIF or KIF Global, is an international non-governmental organization, with its mission to improve quality of people's life by empowering global youth and women to reach their full potential and by providing humanitarian aid to promote global peace and sustainable development. It has affiliated national chapter members in seven countries.

It has global partnerships with UN agencies and international organizations such as United Nations Population Fund (UNFPA), UNICEF's Education Cannot Wait (ECW), World Karate Federation (WKF), Junior Chamber International (JCI), Association of Medical Doctors of Asia (AMDA) and others.

History 

The organization was initially formed when Shin Koyamada and TEDx Talk Speaker Nia Lyte shared their passions of supporting youth, humanitarian aid and cross-cultural activities in the United States. They first begun providing relief foods and drinks to underprivileged families and individuals in Downtown Los Angeles with a group of friends and promoting cultural exchange activities across the United States. 

To benefit KIF's martial arts scholarship program that sponsored underprivileged youth to enroll in a martial arts school in the United States, KIF organized an international martial arts event United States Martial Arts Festival (USMAF), with over 1,000 participants representing 10 different countries and a group of world's renowned martial arts grand masters, including Fumio Demura, Tadashi Yamashita, Takayuki Kubota and businessmen who share similar international visions for the martial arts community, in Redondo Beach, California, in 2010 and 2011.

KIF signed a historic global partnership with its first UN agency named United Nations Population Fund (UNFPA) on women's empowerment and gender-based violence in December 2019, followed by second UN agency partnership with UNICEF's Education Cannot Wait (ECW) on education in emergencies in May, 2020.

Issue areas 

There are 6 global causes that KIF and its all national chapter member organizations focus on in implementing programs, projects and activities catered to their communities and countries. For national causes, each national chapter prioritizes what it wants to focus on from the global causes to align all causes in all chapters, and create and carry out a new program or project based on the needs of its communities and territory.

Youth 

To cultivate global mindset and youth leadership, KIF's national chapter member organizations have partnered up with many high schools and universities, embassies and consulates, and local governments and its board of education to organize a series of global speaker's programs for their youth students in Japan, Colombia, Kenya, United States and other countries where KIF's national chapters are based.

KIF's President Nia Lyte participated as a closing keynote speaker addressing the importance of youth and women's empowerment and leadership at Junior Chamber International (JCI)'s global partnership summit at the United Nations Headquarters in New York in 2018. In addition, KIF has participated numerous JCI's regional events with its global members to collaborate on youth leadership events in the United States and Asia Pacific region. In the following collaborations for a year, KIF and JCI signed a global partnership in February 2019 to continue the important efforts on fostering youth leaderships in different regions.

Gender Equality 

KIF empowers all girls and women to be, do and achieve whatever they strongly believe they want to be, do and achieve in their lives. KIF national chapters have organized series of speaker's programs targeting over 300 women leaders per event to exchange dialogue on women's leaderships.

In December 2019, KIF has partnered with United Nations Population Fund (UNFPA) on a new women's empowerment and gender-based violence initiative as part of the pledges KIF has made during the 25th International Conference on Population and Development (ICPD25) held in Nairobi, Kenya, in November 2019.

Disaster & Emergency 

In emergency response to earthquake, tsunami, and nuclear disaster in Japan, KIF started the disaster relief program and its first national chapter organization KIF Japan in Tokyo to help victims affected by the triple disaster, by providing them the relief funds of over $120,000 raised through fundraisers as well as shipping 20-foot container filled with relief goods and items, which KIF's volunteers collected in Southern California.

In 2019, KIF has partnered with Association of Medical Doctors of Asia (AMDA) to assist AMDA in providing emergency medical aid to people affected by natural calamity, as well as man-made disasters in Asia and other regions. AMDA is an international NGOs with General Consultative Status with the United Nations Economic & Social Council and with an international network of 30 chapters and 47 collaborating organizations around the world.

In May 2020, KIF has partnered with UNICEF's Education Cannot Wait (ECW) to support ECW's comprehensive education programmes for children and youth affected by conflicts, natural disasters, famine, displacement, and outbreaks (including COVID-19 pandemic), right from the onset of crisis through recovery phases through the KIF's national chapters in Latin America and Africa.

Exchanges 

To promote mutual understanding and respect, KIF's national chapters have mobilized the series of grassroots cross-cultural networking events in partnerships with a number of different government agencies, embassies and consulates, and local nonprofit organizations in different countries.

In 2013 and 2014, Hollywood celebrities Dylan Sprouse and Cole Sprouse from Disney Channel's Suite Life traveled to Japan for the first time ever for a KIF's new program United States-Japan Discovery Tour to exchange dialogue with thousands of Japanese youth on the importance of pursuing a higher education and interact with them on cross-cultural activities for two weeks. During the tour, the activities were shared to millions of followers and supporters on social media. 

To strengthen citizen diplomacy and people-to-people activities, KIF and Sister Cities International (SCI) have partnered up to develop new bilateral summits in the United States and other countries in January 2019. In March 2019, KIF and SCI have organized the Japan-Texas Leadership Symposium, hosted by City of San Antonio and supported by the Ministry of Foreign Affairs of Japan to strengthen friendships between people of the United States and Japan and advance cultural and economic exchanges between two nations.

Habitat 

Habitat is one of the core issue areas. Amazon Habitat is a wildlife and rainforest conservation initiative to save the world's largest tropical forest and its biodiversity, as well as support indigenous people who live in the jungle in South America. Safari Habitat initiative is to protect and promote the world's most famous fauna and indigenous community in Africa.

Space 

The Foundation is committed to preserving nature, species and humankind on Earth, yet recognizes the importance of engaging in the exploration, tourism, and research of outer space.

Initiatives 
 Guardian Girls, a public-private partnership program with the United Nations Population Fund (UNFPA) to prevent Gender-based violence for vulnerable girls and young women through martial arts. 
 StarAngel School, an education in emergencies program that provide educational resources and quality learning for those affected by conflicts, natural disasters and displacement.
 StarAngel Center, a disaster relief program that provides relief goods and items and humanitarian assistance to those affected by a natural disaster. 
 Amazon Habitat, a habitat program to help protect, preserve and promote tropical rainforests and wildlife in the Amazon Jungle in South America.
 Safari Habitat, a habitat program to conserve wildlife habitat and preserve and promote cultural heritage of the indigenous peoples in Africa.
 Spacestellar, a space program to attract and engage young people globally to; interact with each other; share and deepen mutual interests, passions and understanding about outer space; cultivate strong team leadership skills; and gain knowledge and experience of space science and technology through space-themed activities.
 Zeal Up, a youth leadership program that empowers the next generations to create greater community change, become active community leaders and global citizens.

Structure 

KIF Global is an international umbrella organization consisting of its global board of directors, management leaderships, standing committees and its national chapter members.

National chapter members 
Each national chapter member is an independent nonprofit organization exclusively licensed to operate in a specific country, governed by its own national boards and officers with national committees, and funded by its supporters and contributors of a designated country. All members of national chapters are local chapter member organizations and individual and corporate members.

Partnerships 

To support and achieve the United Nations' Sustainable Development Goals (SDGs), KIF is committed to enhance strong global partnerships and cooperation with UN agencies and leading international organizations on global programs, advancing mutual interests and aligned purpose. For each KIF's global cause, KIF strategically collaborates with a global partner to design and plan a specific global program targeting specific regions or countries and carry it out in partnerships with KIF's national chapter members that also work closely with the partner's country office. KIF's current global partners are as follows:

UN agencies 
 United Nations Population Fund (UNFPA) - a partnership on Gender-based violence, women's empowerment, gender equality
 UNICEF's Education Cannot Wait (ECW) - a partnership on Education in emergencies

International NGOs 
 World Karate Federation (WKF) - a partnership on Gender-based violence
 Junior Chamber International (JCI) - a partnership on Youth leadership
 Association of Medical Doctors of Asia (AMDA) - a partnership on Disaster relief

Goodwill ambassadors 

Celebrities Dylan Sprouse and Cole Sprouse joined KIF as goodwill ambassadors in 2013. To promote international education and cultural exchanges, Dylan and Cole made their first trips to Japan and empowered thousands of Japanese youth in 10 prefectures of Japan in 2013 and 2014.

References

External links 
 Official website
Koyamada International Foundation on Guidestar

Organizations established in 2008
International organizations based in the United States
Organizations based in Los Angeles
2008 establishments in California
Charities based in California
Poverty-related organizations
Youth organizations
International charities